The Institute for Government (IfG) is a British independent think tank which aims to improve government effectiveness through research and analysis. Based at 2 Carlton Gardens in central London and founded as a charity in 2008, it was initially funded with approximately £15 million by the Gatsby Charitable Foundation, at the instigation of Lord Sainsbury.

In 2019, the Institute was named Think Tank of the Year in Prospect's annual awards. In 2022, it was named Political Communicator of the Year by the Political Studies Association.

Stated aims
The Institute for Government works to make government more effective. It engages with UK MPs, senior civil servants and others by:

 supporting the development and skills of senior public servants, politicians and political advisors.
  conducting and funding research on public administration and government. 
  providing 'thought leadership' on effective government through publications, seminars and events.

The Institute is a registered charity in England and Wales (No.1123926) with cross-party governance.

Director
In October 2022, Dr Hannah White OBE replaced Bronwen Maddox as Director. For the previous six years, she had been Deputy Director of the Institute. Previously, White had spent 10 years at the House of Commons as a parliamentary clerk before running the Committee on Standards in Public Life in the Cabinet Office. She received an OBE in 2020 for services to the constitution and in 2022 published her first book Held in Contempt: what’s wrong with the House of Commons?

Sir Michael Bichard was its first director until 2010. The subsequent directors were Lord Adonis and Peter Riddell.

Funding 
The Institute for Government has been rated as 'highly transparent' in its funding by Transparify.

In November 2022, the funding transparency website Who Funds You? gave the institute a B grade (rating goes from A to E).

See also

 Royal Institute of Public Administration

References

External links
Institute for Government website

Public policy think tanks based in the United Kingdom
Charities based in London